Chipetaia is an extinct genus of primate in the family Omomyidae containing the sole species Chipetaia lamporea known from the middle Eocene of North America. The genus name honors Native American Ute diplomat Chipeta, while the specific name is Greek for "of the Shining Mountains," the Ute name for the Rocky Mountains.

References

Eocene primates
Eocene mammals of North America
Fossil taxa described in 1996
†Chipetaia
Prehistoric primate genera